Government agent may refer to:
 Government Agent (Sri Lanka)
 Federal agent, a law enforcement officer at a federal level agency

See also 
 Federal Agent, a 1936 American crime film
 G-Man (slang)
 Special agent